Below is the list of populated places in Siirt Province, Turkey by the districts. In the following lists first place in each list is the administrative center of the district.

Siirt
Siirt
Akdoğmuş, Siirt
Aktaş, Siirt
Akyamaç, Siirt
Beşyol, Siirt
Bostancık, Siirt
Çöl, Siirt
Demirkaya, Siirt
Doluharman, Siirt
Eğlence, Siirt
Ekmekçiler, Siirt
Gökçebağ, Siirt
Güneşli, Siirt
İnkapı, Siirt
Kalender, Siirt
Kayaboğaz, Siirt
Kayıklı, Siirt
Kelekçi, Siirt
Kışlacık, Siirt
Koçlu, Siirt
Konacık, Siirt
Köprübaşı, Siirt
Meşelidere, Siirt
Meydandere, Siirt
Pınarca, Siirt
Pınarova, Siirt
Sağırsu, Siirt
Sağlarca, Siirt
Sarıtepe, Siirt
Tuzkuyusu, Siirt
Yağmurtepe, Siirt
Yazlıca, Siirt
Yerlibahçe, Siirt
Yokuşbağları, Siirt

Aydınlar
 Aydınlar
Akyayla, Aydınlar
Çatılı, Aydınlar
Çınarlısu, Aydınlar
Dereyamaç, Aydınlar
İkizbağlar, Aydınlar
Taşbalta, Aydınlar

Baykan
 Baykan
 Adakale, Baykanl
 Ardıçdalı, Baykanl
 Atabağı, Baykanl
 Çamtaşı, Baykanl
 Çaykaya, Baykanl
 Çelikli, Baykanl
 Çevrimtepe, Baykanl
 Çukurca, Baykanl
 Dedebakırı, Baykanl
 Demirışık, Baykanl
 Derince, Baykanl
 Dilektepe, Baykanl
 Dokuzçavuş, Baykanl
 Engin, Baykanl
 Gümüşkaş, Baykanl
 Günbuldu, Baykanl
 Gündoğdu, Baykanl
 İkizler, Baykanl
 Karakaya, Baykanl
 Kasımlı, Baykanl
 Meşelik, Baykanl
 Narlıyurt, Baykanl
 Obalı, Baykanl
 Ormanpınar, Baykanl
 Sarıdana, Baykanl
 Sarısalkım, Baykanl
 Tütenocak, Baykanl
 Ulaştı, Baykanl
 Ünlüce, Baykanl
 Yarımca, Baykanl
 Yeşilçevre, Baykanl
 Ziyaret, Baykanl

Eruh
 Eruh
Akdiken, Eruh
Bağgöze, Eruh
Ballıkavak, Eruh
Bayıryüzü, Eruh
Bayramlı, Eruh
Bilgili, Eruh
Bingöl, Eruh
Bozatlı, Eruh
Bozkuş, Eruh
Bölüklü, Eruh
Budamış, Eruh
Cintepe, Eruh
Çeltiksuyu, Eruh
Çetinkol, Eruh
Çırpılı, Eruh
Çimencik, Eruh
Çizmeli, Eruh
Dağdöşü, Eruh
Dalkorur, Eruh
Demiremek, Eruh
Dikboğaz, Eruh
Dönerdöver, Eruh
Ekinyolu, Eruh
Erenkaya, Eruh
Gedikaşar, Eruh
Gelenkardeş, Eruh
Gölgelikonak, Eruh
Gönülaldı, Eruh
Görendoruk, Eruh
Gülburnu, Eruh
Karadayılar, Eruh
Kaşıkyayla, Eruh
Kavakgölü, Eruh
Kavaközü, Eruh
Kekliktepe, Eruh
Kemerli, Eruh
Kılıçkaya, Eruh
Kuşdalı, Eruh
Ormanardı, Eruh
Ortaklı, Eruh
Oymakılıç, Eruh
Özlüpelit, Eruh
Payamlı, Eruh
Salkımbağlar, Eruh
Savaş, Eruh
Ufaca, Eruh
Üzümlük, Eruh
Yanılmaz, Eruh
Yediyaprak, Eruh
Yelkesen, Eruh
Yerliçoban, Eruh
Yeşilören, Eruh
Yokuşlu, Eruh

Kurtalan
 Kurtalan
Ağaçlıpınar, Kurtalan
Akçagedik, Kurtalan
Akçalı, Kurtalan
Akdem, Kurtalan
Aksöğüt, Kurtalan
Atalay, Kurtalan
Avcılar, Kurtalan
Aydemir, Kurtalan
Azıklı, Kurtalan
Bağlıca, Kurtalan
Ballıkaya, Kurtalan
Beykent, Kurtalan
Bozhüyük, Kurtalan
Bölüktepe, Kurtalan
Çakıllı, Kurtalan
Çalıdüzü, Kurtalan
Çattepe, Kurtalan
Çayırlı, Kurtalan
Çeltikbaşı, Kurtalan
Demirkuyu, Kurtalan
Derince, Kurtalan
Ekinli, Kurtalan
Erdurağı, Kurtalan
Gökdoğan, Kurtalan
Gözpınar, Kurtalan
Gürgöze, Kurtalan
Güzeldere, Kurtalan
İğdeli, Kurtalan
İncirlik, Kurtalan
Kapıkaya, Kurtalan
Karabağ, Kurtalan
Kayabağlar, Kurtalan
Kayalısu, Kurtalan
Kılıçlı, Kurtalan
Konakpınar, Kurtalan
Oyacık, Kurtalan
Saipbeyli, Kurtalan
Şenköy, Kurtalan
Taşoluk, Kurtalan
Tatlı, Kurtalan
Tosunbağı, Kurtalan
Toytepe, Kurtalan
Tulumtaş, Kurtalan
Tütün, Kurtalan
Uluköy, Kurtalan
Üçpınar, Kurtalan
Yakıttepe, Kurtalan
Yanarsu, Kurtalan
Yayıklı, Kurtalan
Yellice, Kurtalan
Yeniköprü, Kurtalan
Yeşilkonak, Kurtalan
Yoldurağı, Kurtalan
Yuvalı, Kurtalan
Yürekveren, Kurtalan

Pervari
Pervari
Aşağıbalcılar, Pervari
Ayvalıbağ, Pervari
Beğendik, Pervari
Belenoluk, Pervari
Bentköy, Pervari
Çatköy, Pervari
Çavuşlu, Pervari
Çobanören, Pervari
Çukurköy, Pervari
Doğanca, Pervari
Doğanköy, Pervari
Dolusalkım, Pervari
Düğüncüler, Pervari
Ekindüzü, Pervari (Northeastern Neo-Aramaic: Hertevin, see Hertevin dialect)
Erkent, Pervari
Gökbudak, Pervari
Gökçekoru, Pervari
Gölgeli, Pervari
Güleçler, Pervari
Gümüşören, Pervari
Karasungur, Pervari
Karşıkaya, Pervari
Keskin, Pervari
Kışlacık, Pervari
Kocaçavuş, Pervari
Köprüçay, Pervari
Narsuyu, Pervari
Okçular, Pervari
Ormandalı, Pervari
Palamutlu, Pervari
Sarıdam, Pervari
Sarıyaprak, Pervari
Söğütönü, Pervari
Taşdibek, Pervari
Tosuntarla, Pervari
Tuzcular, Pervari
Üçoyuk, Pervari
Yanıkses, Pervari
Yapraktepe, Pervari
Yeniaydın, Pervari
Yukarıbalcılar, Pervari

Şirvan
 Şirvan
Adıgüzel, Şirvan
Akçayar, Şirvan
Akgeçit, Şirvan
Akyokuş, Şirvan
Bayındır, Şirvan
Belençay, Şirvan
Boylu, Şirvan
Cevizlik, Şirvan
Çeltikyolu, Şirvan
Çınarlı, Şirvan
Daltepe, Şirvan
Damlı, Şirvan
Demirkapı, Şirvan
Derinçay, Şirvan
Dişlinar, Şirvan
Doğruca, Şirvan
Durankaya, Şirvan
Elmadalı, Şirvan
Gözlüce, Şirvan
Gümüş, Şirvan
Hürmüz, Şirvan
İkizler, Şirvan
İncekaya, Şirvan
Kalkancık, Şirvan
Kapılı, Şirvan
Karaca, Şirvan
Kasımlı, Şirvan
Kayahisar, Şirvan
Kesmetaş, Şirvan
Kirazlı, Şirvan
Kömürlü, Şirvan
Madenköy, Şirvan
Meşecik, Şirvan
Nallıkaya, Şirvan
Ormanbağı, Şirvan
Ormanlı, Şirvan
Otluk, Şirvan
Oya, Şirvan
Özpınar, Şirvan
Pirinçli, Şirvan
Sarıdana, Şirvan
Sırçalı, Şirvan
Soğanlı, Şirvan
Soğuksu, Şirvan
Suludere, Şirvan
Suluyazı, Şirvan
Taşlı, Şirvan
Taşyaka, Şirvan
Tatlıpayam, Şirvan
Yağcılar, Şirvan
Yalkaya, Şirvan
Yamaçlı, Şirvan
Yarımtepe, Şirvan
Yaylacı, Şirvan
Yayladağ, Şirvan
Yedikapı, Şirvan
Yolbaşı, Şirvan

References

Siirt
List